Tages is the debut studio album by the Swedish rock band Tages, released on 3 November 1965 on Platina Records. Released during a period in which the band had accumulated four top ten singles in Tio i Topp and as many on Kvällstoppen. This led the band to become one of Sweden's first and foremost pop groups, along with Hep Stars.

It was their first of three albums recorded on Platina Records, after which they'd switch to Parlophone, becoming among the first Swedish groups to do so. Issued in 6000 copies, it sold 10000 and became their first Gold record in Sweden (the second being Tages 2). Despite this apparent success, it failed to chart on Kvällstoppen.

Content 
The album features several garage rock and rhythm and blues standards such as "Dimples" and "Got My Mojo Working" (titled "I Got My Mojo Working" on the album) and can be considered a typical album for the era. However, unlike contemporary albums by other Swedish groups, Tages composed their own material, of which two are on the album. These are "Sleep Little Girl", their first single that hit number one on Tio i Topp and number three on Kvällstoppen. This was the third re-recording of the track as it differs from the single version. The other original composition is "The One For You" which was also released as a single and reached number two on Tio I Topp and number six on Kvällstoppen. "The One For You" is the oldest recorded track on the album, recorded on 5 August 1965.

Other tracks on the album include their cover of "Bloodhound" which was released as a single and reached number six on Tio I Topp, but fared better on Kvällstoppen where it reached number three. The non-album B-Side of that single is one of the first covers of Ian Samwell and Brian Potter's "Whatcha Gonna Do About It", which was released as the Small Faces debut single on 6 August 1965. Tages would go on and make one more Small Faces cover, "Understanding", which appears on their third studio album Extra Extra.

Vocally, the album is democratically divided, with Tommy Blom singing solo on three songs. Göran Lagerberg sings solo on one song and the rest are harmony vocals, performed by various members of the band, including drummer Freddie Skantze and Blom on "Stand by Me"

In contrast to their later albums, which consisted of approximately half-to all tracks original material, Tages only feature two such songs. Tages is the band's only album where their rhythm-and-blues based origins and influences are strongly present; on subsequent albums this is overshadowed by more conventional pop songs and (especially on their three final studio albums) psychedelic-influenced material. "Doctor Feel-Good" would strangely be released as a single by Platina in May 1968; it failed to chart.

Track listing 

(note that the track listing was printed with a few errors on first pressings; "I Got My Mojo Working" is commonly thought to be written by Preston "Red" Foster, while others claim McKinley Morganfield (Muddy Waters) wrote it. "Stand By Me" was written by Ben E. King, Jerry Leiber and Mike Stoller, not by Dean Beard, Ray Doggett and Slim Willet as the album claims)

Personnel

Tages 

 Tommy Blom – vocals, guitar, harmonica
 Danne Larsson – rhythm guitar, vocals
 Göran Lagerberg – bass guitar, vocals
 Anders Töpel – lead guitar, vocals
 Freddie Skantze – drums, percussion

Other musicians 

 Anders Henriksson – piano

Technical 
 Anders Henriksson – producer, studio engineer
 Björn Norén – studio engineer
Peter Knopp – album cover photo
Hans Sidén – illustrations, layout and liner notes

Singles

Charts

References

External links 
 Tages album discography

1965 debut albums
Tages (band) albums